Diplopeltis hueglii is a shrub species in the soapberry family, Sapindaceae. It is endemic to Western Australia. Plants grow to between 0.1 and 1.5 metres high. White, pink or purple flowers are produced between April and December in the species' native range.

The species was first formally described by Austrian botanist Stephen Endlicher in 1837. The type specimen was collected in Fremantle by Charles von Hügel.

Three subspecies are currently recognised:
D. huegelii Endl. subsp. huegelii 	
D. huegelii subsp. lehmannii (Miq.) KeigheryD. huegelii subsp. subintegra'' (A.S.George) Keighery

References

Dodonaeoideae
Rosids of Western Australia
Sapindales of Australia